David E. Fairbrothers was an American botanist, Professor Emeritus and former chair of the Department of Biological Sciences of Rutgers University. In 1989 the Botanical Society of America gave him the Merit Award, their highest honor. The D. E. Fairbrothers Plant Resource Center at Rutgers is named in his honor.

References

21st-century American botanists
Living people
Year of birth missing (living people)